The Isolation Game is the fourth full-length studio album by the Italian melodic death metal band Disarmonia Mundi, and was released on December 9, 2009 by Coroner Records. It features guest appearances by Björn "Speed" Strid of Soilwork and Olof Mörck of Nightrage/Dragonland/Amaranthe.

Track listing
 "Cypher Drone" – 4:29
 "Structural Wound" – 3:18
 "Perdition Haze" – 4:20
 "Building An Empire of Dust" – 4:23
 "Stepchild of Laceration" – 5:01
 "The Isolation Game" – 4:05
 "Blacklight Rush" – 3:47
 "Glimmer" – 2:01
 "Ties That Bind" – 4:05
 "Losing Ground" – 4:14
 "Same Old Nails for a New Messiah" – 3:58
 "Digging the Grave of Silence" – 4:18
 "Beneath a Colder Sun" – 1:25
 "The Shape of Things to Come" (Japanese Bonus Track) – 4:10

Personnel

Disarmonia Mundi
 Ettore Rigotti – guitar, bass guitar, drums, keyboards, clean vocals
 Claudio Ravinale − death vocals, lyrics

Guests
 Björn "Speed" Strid – guest vocals on tracks 1, 2, 6, 7, 9, 11, and 14
 Olof Mörck – guitar solos on tracks 5 and 10

External links
 Disarmonia Mundi discography
 BLABBERMOUTH.NET – DISARMONIA MUNDI: New Album Details Revealed

Disarmonia Mundi albums
2009 albums